Mardin station is a railway station in Mardin on the Mardin-Senyurt Railway Line.

External links
 CIOB - Chemin de Fer Impérial Ottoman de Baghdad Trains of Turkey

Railway stations in Mardin Province
1918 establishments in the Ottoman Empire
Buildings and structures in Mardin
Railway stations opened in 1918
Transport in Mardin Province